Jean-Pierre Boyer (27 July 1829 – 16 December 1896) was a French prelate of the Catholic Church who was Bishop of Clermont from 1879 to 1893 and Archbishop of Bourges from 1893 until his death. He was made a cardinal in 1895.

Biography 
Jean-Pierre Boyer was born on 27 July 1827 in Paray-le-Monial, the son of a carpenter. First a vicar in Autun, he followed his parents to Aix-en-Provence and became the private secretary of the archbishop of Aix. He was then professor of dogmatic theology, superior of the major seminary, and rector of the theological faculty of Aix-en-Provence.

Boyer was appointed bishop coadjutor of the Diocese of Clermont on 12 June 1878 and on the following 15 July named titular bishop of Euroea. He received his episcopal consecration in Aix-en-Provence on 24 August 1878 from Théodore-Augustin Forcade, Archbishop of Aix. His coat of arms paid tribute to his family with carpenter's planes, rough beams, and daisies.

Over his objections, Boyer was appointed by a decree of the President of the Republic on 26 November 1892 to lead the Archdiocese of Bourges. He persisted in his refusal until the Holy See intervened and he accepted the assignment. He was therefore transferred on 19 January 1893 and installed on 14 March.

Pope Leo XIII made him a cardinal on 29 November 1895. He received the regalia of his office in Paris on 11 December from Félix Faure, president of France. Pope Leo granted him the title of cardinal priest of the Santissima Trinità dei Monti on 25 June 1896.

He died in Bourges on 16 December 1896 at the age of 67 and was buried in the cathedral there.

References

External links
 
 

1829 births
1896 deaths
Cardinals created by Pope Leo XIII
Archbishops of Bourges
People from Paray-le-Monial